Adam Fletcher may refer to:
 Adam Fletcher (speaker) (born 1975), author, activist and educator
 Adam Fletcher (rugby league) (born 1983), rugby league player